Collective leadership is a distribution of power within an organizational structure.

Communist examples

China

Collective leadership in China and Chinese Communist Party (CCP) is generally considered to have begun with Deng Xiaoping in the late 1970s, who tried to encourage the CCP Politburo Standing Committee to rule by consensus in order to prevent the authoritarianism of Maoist rule. CCP general secretary Jiang Zemin formally established himself as the "first among equals". This era of collective leadership has been said to end with Xi Jinping, following the abolition of term limits in 2018 under his tenure.

Currently, the central authority of the Chinese government and CCP is concentrated in the CCP Politburo Standing Committee, which is composed of seven members of the Communist Party and headed by the CCP general secretary.

The position of CCP general secretary has become more powerful in Xi Jinping's administration.

Vietnam
In Vietnam, when the country was ruled by Lê Duẩn, collective leadership involved powers being distributed from the office of General Secretary of the Communist Party and shared with the Politburo Standing Committee while still retaining one ruler.

Nowadays, in Vietnam there is not one paramount leader, and power is shared by the General Secretary, President and the Prime Minister along with collegial bodies such as the Politburo, Secretariat and the Central Committee.

Soviet Union

Collective leadership or  Collectivity of leadership, was considered an ideal form of governance in the Union of Soviet Socialist Republics (USSR). Its main task was to distribute powers and functions among the Politburo, the Central Committee, and the Council of Ministers to hinder any attempts to create a one-man dominance over the Soviet political system by a Soviet leader, such as that seen under Joseph Stalin's rule. On the national level, the heart of the collective leadership was officially the Central Committee of the Communist Party, but in practice, was the Politburo. Collective leadership is characterized by limiting the powers of the General Secretary and the Chairman of the Council of Ministers (Premier) as related to other offices by enhancing the powers of collective bodies, such as the Politburo.

Lenin was, according to Soviet literature, the perfect example of a leader ruling in favour of the collective. Stalin was also claimed to embody this style of ruling, with most major policy decisions involving lengthy discussion and debate in the politburo and/or central committee; after his death in 1953, Nikita Khrushchev accused Stalin of one-man dominance, leading to controversy surrounding the period of his rule. At the 20th Party Congress, Stalin's reign was criticized by Khrushchev as a "personality cult". As Stalin's successor, Khrushchev supported the ideal of collective leadership but increasingly ruled in an autocratic fashion, his anti-Stalin accusations followed by much the same behaviour which led to accusations of hypocrisy. In 1964, Khrushchev was ousted and replaced by Leonid Brezhnev as General Secretary and by Alexei Kosygin as Premier. Collective leadership was strengthened during the Brezhnev years and the later reigns of Yuri Andropov and Konstantin Chernenko. Mikhail Gorbachev's reforms helped spawn factionalism within the Soviet leadership, and members of Gorbachev's faction openly disagreed with him on key issues. The factions usually disagreed on how little or how much reform was needed to rejuvenate the Soviet system.

Directorial government 

The Directorial system is a system of government in which executive power is held by a group of people who operate under a system of collegiality. While there may be a nominal leader, the post is considered to be ceremonial or a first among equals and it typically rotates among its members.

Other party examples
Green and socialist parties often practice collective leadership, either through male and female co-leaders or through several co-spokespersons. This practice is often justified by the Green movement's emphasis on consensus decision making and gender balance.  
 Alliance 90/The Greens: the Federal Executive is divided between two co-equal spokespersons, a political director, treasurer, and two vice-chairs.
 Québec solidaire divides its leadership among its president, secretary-general, and male and female spokespersons
 Green Party of England and Wales: from 1990 to 1991, the GPE&W practiced co-leadership among six spokespersons, and from 1991-2008, the GPEW practiced it through a male and female spokesperson. After Caroline Lucas was elected the party's first sole leader and deputy leader in 2008, collective leadership was in hiatus until 2016, when the party leadership was once again divided between male and female co-leaders under a job-share agreement while retaining a deputy leader.
 Left Bloc (Portugal): formally, it has always had a collective leadership as provided for in its by-laws and no one-person office has ever been recognised. However, in practice, there has always been a single prominent figure (coordinator, 1999-2012 and 2016-; spokesperson, 2014-2016), except for between 2012 and 2014, when it had a de facto co-leadership between a male and a female apart from the legal structures. From 2014 to 2016, there was an informal collective and gender-balanced leadership of six people on top of the existing bodies, with a member serving as the party's spokesperson.
 Scottish Green Party: began to practice collective leadership in 2004 with the election of a male and a female co-convenor. 
 Green Party of the United States: the Green National Committee's steering committee is a collective leadership of seven co-chairs, as well as a secretary and a treasurer.
 The Left (Germany): the party executive consists of an elected 44-member committee, headed by a 12-member executive board comprising two party chairpeople, four deputy chairs, a national secretary, treasurer, and four other members.
 International Socialist Alternative: The leading body of the ISA is the World Congress, which elects an International Committee (IC) to govern between congresses. The IC then appoints an International Executive (IE) body which is responsible for the day-to-day work of the International.
Several Irish left-wing parties have collective leadership:
People Before Profit–Solidarity
Solidarity
People Before Profit
Socialist Party
Independents 4 Change

References

Further reading

 
 
 
 
 

Communism
Politics of the Soviet Union
Collective leadership